is a Japanese former professional road and track cyclist. Considered one of Japan's most successful cyclists in his decade, Iijima has claimed a total of nine track cycling medals (two golds, three silver, and four bronze) at the Asian Championships, two silvers at the Asian Games (1998 and 2002), and three national time trial titles at the Japanese Championships (1998, 2004, and 2005). He also represented his nation Japan in three editions of the Olympic Games (2000, 2004, and 2008). He announced his retirement from professional cycling in October 2010 as a member of the  team.

Racing career
Iijima was born in Hino, Tokyo.

Amateur years
Despite earning his first career medal in road racing at the 1998 Asian Games in Bangkok, Thailand, Iijima made his official debut, as a 29-year-old, at the 2000 Summer Olympics in Sydney, where he finished sixteenth in the men's points race with a total score of six sprint points.

At the 2002 Asian Games in Busan, Iijima paired up with Shinichi Fukushima to grab a silver medal in the men's madison on 11 points, trailing behind the South Korean duo Suh Seok-Kyu and 2000 Olympian Cho Ho-Sung by an ample, twenty-seven point margin after ten intermediate sprint laps. In the same year, he outsprinted his brother Noriyuki Iijima and Hong Kong's Wong Kam Po to take the men's points race title at the Asian Championships in Bangkok, Thailand.

When he competed for the second time at the 2004 Summer Olympics in Athens, Iijima managed to finish the men's points race successfully in sixteenth place with 13 points, matching his position from Sydney four years earlier in the process.

Professional career
Iijima turned professional as a road rider in 2005, and eventually stayed with Sumita Ravanello Pearl Izumi for one cycling season, before he left himself without a contract. He was also crowned the winner Japanese National Time Trial Championships in the same year.

As a two-year free agent, Iijima redrafted his efforts to edge out Iran's Hossein Askari and Hong Kong's Cheung King Wai for his second career gold in the men's point race at the 2006 Asian Cycling Championships in Kuala Lumpur, Malaysia, adding a bronze in the men's time trial to his career resume. Later that year, at the Asian Games in Doha, Iijima narrowly missed the podium with a fourth-place finish in the points race (a total of ten) and sixth in the men's road race (3:45:05).

Eight years after his first Olympics, Iijima qualified for his third Japanese squad, as a 37-year-old and a cycling team captain, in the men's points race at the 2008 Summer Olympics in Beijing by receiving a berth from the UCI Track World Rankings. Iijima picked up a total of 23 points, and lapped the field once to score a career-high eighth place in a  sprint race. Strong results on his third Olympic bid landed him a spot on the  pro cycling team for three annual seasons.

At the 2009 East Asian Games in Macau, Iijima delivered the Japanese foursome of Kazuo Inoue, Kazuhiro Mori and Hayato Yoshida a gold-medal time of 1:38:38.84 in the men's team time trial, finishing ahead of the Chinese team by more than two minutes.

Major results

1998
 1st  Time trial, National Road Championships
 2nd Road race, Asian Games
1999
 2nd Time trial, National Road Championships
2001
 1st Stage 4 Perlis Open
2002
 Asian Track Championships
1st Points race
2nd Elimination race
 2nd Madison, Asian Games
 3rd Points race, UCI Track Cycling World Cup Classics, Moscow
2003
 2nd Time trial, National Road Championships
2004
 Asian Track Championships
1st Points race
2nd Elimination race
 1st  Time trial, National Road Championships
2005
 1st  Time trial, National Road Championships
 Asian Track Championships
3rd Points race
3rd Team pursuit
2006
 Asian Cycling Championships
1st Points race
3rd Time trial
 Tour de East Java
1st Stages 1 & 5
 1st Stage 3 Tour de Kumano
 1st Stage 3 Tour d'Indonesia
 2nd Time trial, National Road Championships
 Asian Games
4th Points race
6th Road race
2007
 1st Stage 1 Jelajah Malaysia
 1st Stage 3 Tour de Kumano
 Asian Track Championships
2nd Madison
3rd Points race
2008
 3rd Team pursuit, Asian Track Championships
 8th Points race, Olympic Games
2009
 1st Team time trial, East Asian Games
 1st Stage 1 Jelajah Malaysia
 National Road Championships
2nd Time trial
7th Road race
 10th Overall Tour de Okinawa
2010
 National Road Championships
3rd Time trial
8th Road race
 10th Points race, UCI Track Cycling World Championships
2012
 8th JBCF Simofusa Criterium
2013
 2nd JBCF Makuhari Criterium

References

External links
NBC 2008 Olympics profile

1971 births
Living people
Japanese male cyclists
Japanese track cyclists
Cyclists at the 2000 Summer Olympics
Cyclists at the 2004 Summer Olympics
Cyclists at the 2008 Summer Olympics
Cyclists at the 1994 Asian Games
Cyclists at the 1998 Asian Games
Cyclists at the 2002 Asian Games
Cyclists at the 2006 Asian Games
Asian Games medalists in cycling
Olympic cyclists of Japan
Sportspeople from Tokyo
Asian Games silver medalists for Japan
Medalists at the 1998 Asian Games
Medalists at the 2002 Asian Games